Hansabank was a bank operating in Estonia, Latvia, and Lithuania owned by the FöreningsSparbanken/Swedbank, a Swedish bank. Following a decision taken by the Swedbank group on 15 September 2008, the Hansabank name was discontinued in 2009 with all operations rebranded under the Swedbank name.

Origins
The history of the Hansabank Group dates back to 1 July 1991 when Hansapank started operating as a branch of Tartu Kommertspank (Tartu Commercial Bank) in Estonia. Officially Hansapank launched independent operations on 10 January 1992. Hansabank was founded in Estonia by Hannes Tamjärv, Jüri Mõis, Rain Lõhmus and Heldur Meerits.

Expansion
The following year the bank set up its first subsidiary, AS Hansa Liising (Hansa Leasing), which focused on selling leasing products. In 1995 Hansabank also opened a branch in Riga, the capital of the neighbouring country Latvia and Hansa Liising's subsidiary, AS Hansa Leasing Latvia, was also launched. In 1996 Hansabank Group was formed and Hansabank's Latvian consumer banking was expanded through a merger with the German-Latvian Bank (Deutsche-Lettische Bank).

In 1996, Hansabank established its presence in the largest of the Baltic states, Lithuania. Differently from Estonia and Latvia, the first company set up there was Hansa Leasing Lithuania. In 1996 Hansabank Markets were created on the basis of bank's financial markets division; this unit dealt with financial markets of Baltic states. It was during this early period of rapid expansion that American investor and tycoon, Raymond Staples, became one of the first western investors to acquire a significant stake in the bank's now public shares. The year 1998 marks the period of mergers in the history of the bank. In April 1998, Hansabank merged with Eesti Hoiupank. In June 1998, the holding company of the Hansa Leasing Group, Hansa Capital, and Hoiupanga Liising (Hoiupank Leasing) signed a sales agreement. In September 1998, Hansabank Latvia and Hoiupank's Latvian subsidiary, signed a merger agreement.

The same year Swedish FöreningSparbanken (currently Swedbank) obtained over 50 per cent of Hansabank's shares through a share issue. In 2005 Swedbank made a buy-out offer to the minority shareholders and as of today Hansabank is a fully owned subsidiary of Swedbank Group.

In July 1999, Hansabank's Lithuanian subsidiary Hansabankas opened its doors to clients in Vilnius, adding commercial banking to the services provided by Hansabank Group in Lithuania.

On 10 March 2005 Hansabank successfully completed the acquisition of the Moscow-based OAO Kvest bank in Russia, which briefly operated under the Hansabank brand but has since been renamed Swedbank.

National names and rebranding as Swedbank
Hansabank operated under the names: Hansapank (in Estonia), Hansabanka (in Latvia), Hansabankas (in Lithuania) and Hansabank internationally.

Source: Hansabanka
Source: Hansabank Group

The Swedish banking group Swedbank obtained 50% of the group shares in 1998. It now owns 100% of Hansabank.

In the Baltic states, the main competitor of the Hansabank Group is the Swedish banking group SEB, which owns SEB Eesti Ühispank, SEB Unibanka and SEB Vilniaus bankas.

Following the decision to rebrand the bank under the Swedbank name, a number of branches were renamed as Swedbank. The legal name of the bank changed in spring 2009, while the whole process of the brand change was completed by autumn 2009.

Controversy
In 1994, some of the funds for the illegal sale and illegal shipments of Russian weapons during the Iraq oil for food programme went through HansaBank to Estonia.

See also 
 Hanseatic League for historical basis of name.

References

External links 
 Hansapank's (Estonia) homepage
 Hansabanka's (Latvia) homepage
 Hansabankas' (Lithuania) homepage

Defunct banks of Estonia
Defunct banks of Latvia
Defunct banks of Lithuania
Banks established in 1992
Latvian companies established in 1992
Banks disestablished in 2009